The Iqra Academy is a girls-only independent school opened in 2009 in Peterborough, England. It is based around Islamic principles, however accepts both Muslim and non-Muslim students.

References

Educational institutions established in 2009
2009 establishments in England
Secondary schools in Peterborough